Rayners Lane F.C. are a football club based in Rayners Lane in the London Borough of Harrow, England.

History

Rayners Lane Football Club was established in 1933. By the 1960s the club had joined the Spartan League. The club left the league in 1970, but returned for two seasons between 1973 and 1975, during which time they reached the Second Round of the FA Vase. They joined the Hellenic Football League Division One in 1978, winning the league in 1981–82 and gaining promotion to the Premier Division. During the late 1980s and early 1990s the club entered the FA Cup, reaching the Second Qualifying Round in 1992–93. The club remained in the Premier Division until being relegated in 1994 due to not having floodlights. After two seasons in Division One, Rayners Lane left the Hellenic League and joined the Middlesex League. In 1998, the club joined the Chiltonian League Premier Division, which after two seasons merged with the Hellenic League. Rayners Lane were placed in Division One East.

In the 2012-13 season manager Dene Gardner guided Rayners Lane to the Hellenic Football League Division One East title, which would've seen the club promoted to the Hellenic Premier Division, however they were denied promotion due to ground grading issues. Gardner departed the club and was replaced by Mick Bradshaw. Rayners Lane remained in Division One East until the end of 2016-17 when they were transferred to the Spartan South Midlands Football League.

In June 2017, David Fox was appointed as the club's new manager. He guided the Lane to 13th and 12th place finishes respectively in his first two seasons. The 2019-20 season saw Rayners Lane challenge for promotion, with the club sat in 4th place before the season was ended due to the COVID-19 pandemic.

The club transferred to the Combined Counties Football League for 2021-22. In October 2021 David Fox left his position as manager and was replaced by a management team of Ben Hanley and Warren Gaddy. Rayners Lane qualified for the playoffs, finishing the season in 4th place before losing to eventual winners Wallingford Town in the semi final. Hanley and Gaddy subsequently departed the club and were replaced by Scott Patmore.

Ground
Rayners Lane play their home games at Tithe Farm Sports And Social Club, 151 Rayners Lane, Harrow, Middlesex.

In April 2018, construction work began to install a new state of the art 3G pitch at the ground for the 2018/2019 season.

The New Tithe Farm Sports & Social Club  House and Function Suite was operational from 3 June 2019 and was officially opened on the 5th Oct 2019 by Daniel P Gallagher at the Opening Gala Dinner

Current coaching staff

Honours
Hellenic Football League Division One East
Champions 2012-13
Hellenic Football League Division One
Champions 1982–83

Records
FA Cup
Second Qualifying Round 1992–93
FA Vase
Second Round 1974–75

References

External links
Club website
Club history

Football clubs in London
Hellenic Football League
Spartan South Midlands Football League
Parthenon League
1933 establishments in England
Association football clubs established in 1933
Football clubs in England
Sport in the London Borough of Harrow
Combined Counties Football League